() is a municipality in Troms og Finnmark county, Norway. The administrative centre of the municipality is the village of Karasjok. Other villages include Dorvonjárga, Šuoššjávri, and Váljohka.

The  municipality is the second largest by area out of the 356 municipalities in Norway. Karasjok is the 247th most populous municipality in Norway with a population of 2,584.

A survey conducted on behalf of the Sami Language Council in the year 2000 showed that 94 percent of the population are Sami speakers.

General information
The municipality of Karasjok was established on 1 January 1866 when it was separated from the old Kistrand municipality. Initially, the population of Karasjok was 515. The municipal borders have not changed since that time.

On 1 January 2020, the municipality became part of the newly formed Troms og Finnmark county. Previously, it had been part of the old Finnmark county.

Name
Karasjok is a Norwegianized form of the Northern Sami language name Kárášjohka. The meaning of the first element could be káráš from Northern Sami which could mean "food plate of wood", or from Finnish, kara, "something that sticks". The last element is johka which means "river", whose equivalent in Finnish is joki.

The name of the municipality was Karasjok until 1990 when it was changed to Kárášjohka-Karasjok. It was the third municipality in Norway to get a Sami name. In 2005, the name was again changed, such that either Kárášjohka or Karasjok can be used.

Coat of arms
The coat of arms was granted on 27 June 1986. The official blazon is "Gules, three five-tongued flames Or two and one". This means the arms have a red field (background) and the charge is three five-tongued flames with two above one. The flames have a tincture of Or which means it is commonly colored yellow, but if it is made out of metal, then gold is used. The red color and flame designs were chosen as a symbol for the importance of fire to the local (nomadic) Sami people. The fire brings both heat and thus survival during the harsh winters, but it is also a major threat, both in the tents as well as in the large pine forests. The fire is also the point around which people gather and it is a guard against dangers. The flag contains three flames also because Kárásjoga-Karasjok is a place where three peoples live: the Sami, Norwegians, and Kvens.

History
In 2015 the second edition of Sápmi Pride, was held in Karasjok.

Churches
The Church of Norway has one parish within the municipality of Karasjok. It is part of the Indre Finnmark prosti (deanery) in the Diocese of Nord-Hålogaland.

Transportation

There is an official border crossing between Dorvonjárga (Norway) and Karigasniemi (Finland), over the Anarjohka river. The European route E6 highway passes through the municipality from Lakselv to Tana bru and Kirkenes in the east.

Government
All municipalities in Norway, including Karasjok, are responsible for primary education (through 10th grade), outpatient health services, senior citizen services, unemployment and other social services, zoning, economic development, and municipal roads. The municipality is governed by a municipal council of elected representatives, which in turn elect a mayor. The municipality falls under the Indre Finnmark District Court and the Hålogaland Court of Appeal.

Municipal council
The municipal council  of Karasjok is made up of 19 representatives that are elected to four year terms. The party breakdown of the council is as follows:

Mayors
The mayors of Karasjok:

1867–1893: Mathis Isaksen
1894–1895: Carl Maxmilian Fandrem
1896–1903: Hans Olaus Saxlund
1904–1904: Anders J. Lindi
1905–1907: Josef Isaksen
1908–1910: Kristian Nissen
1911–1916: Bendiks Løining
1917–1919: Oluf Hagen
1920–1922: Oluf Ludvig Jenssen
1923–1925: Arne Havig Faye
1926–1928: Oluf Hagen
1929–1931: Einar Isaksen
1932–1934: Alf Wiig
1935–1940: Samuel Norvang
1941–1943: Einar Isaksen
1944–1947: Samuel Norvang
1948–1955: Jon Fagerli
1956–1962: Lydolf Lind Meløy
1962–1965: Amund Nedrejord
1966–1971: Hans Rønbeck
1972–1975: Hans Guttorm
1976–1979: Norvald Soleng
1980–1981: Hans Guttorm
1982–1983: Svein Ole Persen
1984–1987: Norvald Soleng
1988–2011: Kjell H. Sæther
2011–2015: Anne Toril Eriksen Balto
2015–present: Svein Atle Somby (Ap)

Geography

The municipality is situated along the upper river basin of the Deatnu / Tana river and its tributaries: Anárjohka and Kárášjohka. It includes large tracts of the high Finnmarksvidda plateau. Lakes in the region include Čorotjávri, Gásadatjávri, Iešjávri, and Idjajávri. The river valley, unlike the plateau, is covered with pine and birch forests. The southern part of the municipality is part of the Øvre Anárjohka National Park.

Climate
Karasjok has a typical subarctic climate with cold, long and dry winters, and short summers that can see warm periods. In this far northeastern part of Norway, the climate is much more continental and dry compared to the typical coastal climate in Norway.

Situated in a river valley on this plateau, Karasjok has recorded the coldest official temperature ever in Norway:  on 1 January 1886. The warmest temperature ever recorded is  recorded July 1914 at an earlier weather station. The warmest month on record was July 2014 with mean  and average daily high . The coldest month in more recent decades is February 2007 with mean  and average daily low .

Wildlife
The birdlife to be found in this municipality is characteristic for the region. The inland habitats of Finnmarksvidda are known for their rich bird life with species like Bluethroat preferring areas with scrub. The Tana river also flows through Karasjok and many of the species found in higher areas use it as a migration route.

In late 2022, there were estimated to be 16 bears are in the municipality.

Economy

Most people live in the village of Karasjok (Kárášjohka). About 80% of the population is Sami speaking, and Sami and Norwegian have equal status in the municipality.

Tourism
The attractions include the Sami parliament, Samediggi, the Sami museum, and the Old Karasjok Church, dating from 1807. The Sami parliament was opened in 1989, by King Olav V, the first Sami parliament president was Ole Henrik Magga, from Kautokeino. He was the president for more than eight years. The Old Karasjok Church is the oldest Lutheran church in Finnmark county. The church is today too small, so a new, larger, wooden Karasjok Church, inspired by Sami architecture, has been built. Karasjok is also the place to look for duodji, Sami handicraft.

Notable people

 Samuel Balto (1861 in Karasjok – 1921) a Norwegian–Sami explorer and adventurer in Alaska, Greenland and Canada
 Ole Ravna (1841 in Karasjok – 1906) a Norwegian-Sami explorer and adventurer. Ravna and Balto were members of the Fridtjof Nansen's Greenland expedition.
 Matti Aikio (1872 in Karasjok – 1929) a Norwegian Sami writer
 Iver Jåks (1932 in Karasjok – 2007) a Norwegian Sami artist, used Sami culture and mythology in his artistic works
 Inga Ravna Eira (1948 in Karasjok) a Norwegian Northern Sami language poet, children's writer, translator and schoolteacher
 Mari Boine (born 1956 in Gámehisnjárga) a Norwegian singer
 Tor Mikkel Wara (born 1964 in Karasjok) a Norwegian former politician
 Ragnhild Vassvik Kalstad (born 1966) politician, former member of Karasjok municipal council
 Anita Nergaard (born 1967), a Norwegian Sami diplomat
 Susanne Guttorm, (Norwegian Wiki) (born 1996 in Karasjok) a Norwegian model and Miss Norway 2018

Sport 
 Jan Egil Brekke (born 1974) a Norwegian footballer, grew up in Karasjok
 Leif Arne Brekke (born 1977) a Norwegian footballer, grew up in Karasjok
 Hans Norbye (born 1987 in Karasjok) a Norwegian footballer

References

External links

Municipal fact sheet from Statistics Norway 
Karasjok on VisitNorway.com
Pictures from Karasjok

 
Municipalities of Troms og Finnmark
Sámi-language municipalities
Populated places of Arctic Norway
1866 establishments in Norway